Setharja railway station is located in Setharja town Thari Mirwah tehsil, Khairpur of Sindh province, Pakistan.

See also
 List of railway stations in Pakistan
 Pakistan Railways

References

External links

Railway stations in Khairpur District
Thari Mirwah
Railway stations on Karachi–Peshawar Line (ML 1)